Trap for the Assassin is a 1966 film directed by Riccardo Freda and starring Georges Géret, Irene Papas and Jean-Pierre Marielle. It is an adaptation of the 1886 novel Roger la Honte by Jules Mary.

Cast
 Georges Géret as Roger Laroque  
 Irene Papas as Julia de Noirville 
 Jean-Pierre Marielle as Lucien de Noirville  
 Jean Topart as Luversan  
 Sabine Sun as Victoire  
 Gabriele Tinti as Raymond de Noirville  
 Germaine Delbat as La mère Brun - la servante de Larouette

Production
Trap for the Assassin was based on Roger la Honte, one of the most popular feuilletons by Jules Mary. The script for the film was adapted by Jean-Louis Bory, who was an admirer of Freda's work, having met him in 1962 in Paris. Bory claimed that he wrote the adaptation and dialogue exclusive to function with Freda's direction.

According to Freda and his assistant director Yves Boisset, Trapped for the Assassin was a project Freda really cared about. Shooting for the film took four weeks and used three cameras at once.

Release
Trap for the Assassin was released in France on 17 May 1966. It was distributed theatrically in Italy by Regional as Trappola per l'assassino on 21 October 1966. Italian film historian Roberto Curti stated that the film had poor distribution and was hardly noticed by critics or audiences. It has been given an English title Trap for the Assassin despite that the film does not appear to have been released overseas.

Reception
In France, '''s reviewer praised Freda's direction in the film "We would like that all...knew as much as Freda how to handle a camera (see the trail sequence) and its spectacular potential. That's what makes this cheap little film such a beautiful illusion and a definite pleasure" Gilles Jacob praised the film, but noted that "let's face it, we would not go see [the film], were it signed by Cayatte or Maurice Cloche."

See also
 List of French films of 1966
 List of Italian films of 1966

 References 

Footnotes

Sources

 
 Goble, Alan. The Complete Index to Literary Sources in Film''. Walter de Gruyter, 1999.

External links 
 

1966 films
French historical drama films
Italian historical drama films
1960s historical drama films
1960s French-language films
Films directed by Riccardo Freda
Films based on French novels
Films set in the 19th century
1960s Italian films
1960s French films